Sacred and Profane may refer to:

 Sacred–profane dichotomy, the contrast between sacred and profane, a basic characteristic of religion
 Sacred and Profane Love (film), a 1921 American silent drama film
 Sacred and Profane (novel), a 1987 novel by Faye Kellerman
 Sacred and Profane (Britten), a collection of songs composed by Benjamin Britten
 Songs Sacred and Profane, a 1929 song cycle by John Ireland
 Sacred and Profane Love, a c. 1514 oil painting by Titian
 Live: Sacred and Profane, a 2000 live album from American new wave band Berlin
 The Sacred and Profane Love Machine, a 1974 novel by Iris Murdoch
 Sacred and Profane, a 1514 series of recordings of the Swedish Chamber Choir